Alfred Ernest Hind (7 April 1878 – 21 March 1947) was an English sportsman who played first-class cricket for Cambridge University and represented England at rugby union.

Personal history
Hind was born in Preston, Lancashire in 1878. He was educated at Uppingham School before entering Trinity Hall, Cambridge in 1897. He gained four sporting Blues in athletics between 1898 and 1901 and ran the 100 yards in 9.8 seconds on two occasions. He gained a further Blue with the rugby team in 1900. On leaving university he became a solicitor.

Cricket career
A right arm medium pace bowler and handy lower order batsman, Hind played most of his cricket for Cambridge but also appeared in a first-class match for Nottinghamshire. That match came in the 1901 County Championship, against Leicestershire at Aylestone Road, but in a low scoring encounter but wasn't called on to bowl by his captain Arthur Jones. The previous year he had played a three-day match for Nottinghamshire against the touring West Indians and made what would have been his highest score of 60 except the match wasn't awarded first-class status.

Hind's first year at Cambridge University Cricket Club was his best, claiming 35 wickets at 17.91 in 1898. He took his career best figures of 7 for 30 on debut, in a University Match against CI Thornton's England XI and despite him taking a further two wickets in the second innings they still lost the match. Perhaps the biggest name out of his 80 first-class victims was the great W.G. Grace, whom Hind dismissed when the England Test cricketer was playing for the Marylebone Cricket Club in 1900.

Rugby career
Hind had a long and distinguished rugby career, first representing Cambridge University while a student. He played in the Varsity Match of 1900 and on leaving he joined Leicester. The first of Hind's two England rugby union caps was a Test in 1905 against New Zealand. The other came the following year when he played against Wales in a Home Nations encounter. In 1903 he toured South Africa with the British Isles and he played his club rugby at Nottingham, mostly as a winger.

References

External links

1878 births
1947 deaths
Alumni of Trinity Hall, Cambridge
British & Irish Lions rugby union players from England
Cambridge University cricketers
Cambridge University R.U.F.C. players
Cricketers from Preston, Lancashire
England international rugby union players
English cricketers
English rugby union players
Leicester Tigers players
Nottingham R.F.C. players
Nottinghamshire cricketers
People educated at Uppingham School
Rugby union players from Preston, Lancashire